Thoudam Prabha Devi is the vice-chancellor  of the Jayoti Vidyapeeth Women's University in Jaipur. She is the youngest women vice-chancellor in India.

References

Women educators from Rajasthan
Educators from Rajasthan
Living people
Year of birth missing (living people)
Heads of universities and colleges in India